The players draft for the 2020 Pakistan Super League took place at National Cricket Academy, Lahore on 6 December 2019. The first round took place on 3 November 2019 to determine pick order. As this season was scheduled to be held entirely in Pakistan, only the players who were comfortable with playing in Pakistan were included in this draft.

Background
The Pakistan Cricket Board (PCB) have announced that the team to have the first pick of the draft will be decided by a street cricket game called Pugam on 3 November 2019. It was held at the Gaddafi Stadium in Lahore. The rest of the draft was decided by a super computer.

Transfer

On 30 November 2019, it was announced that Usman Shinwari was transferred from Kings to Qalandars.

Retained players
On 1 December 2019, PSL announced the retention players list with all six teams retaining a total of 45 players from previous season.

Draft picks
The draft took place on 6 December 2019 at the National Cricket Academy in Lahore. A total of 425 foreign players from 22 countries were registered for the draft. Quetta Gladiators, the defending champions, got the first pick in the opening round of the 2020 PSL draft, followed by Lahore Qalandars. The order for the other four teams was: Multan Sultans (third), Islamabad United (fourth), Peshawar Zalmi (fifth) and Karachi Kings (last).

Replacements
Following players were replaced in PSL replacement draft.

A day before the tournament, Anwar Ali replaced Umar Akmal in Gladiators squad, who became unavailable after he was suspended by PCB with immediate effect under Article 4.7.1 of its anti-corruption code, disallowing him from taking part in any cricket-related activity under the board's purview, "pending the investigation being carried out by PCB's Anti-Corruption Unit". Akmal faced no sanction, only a reminder of his responsibilities, with a PCB statement saying that he had "offered his regrets" to the PCB for his action, and was in turn reprimanded and "reminded him of his responsibilities as a senior cricketer". A week into the tournament Lahore Qalandars' Haris Rauf suffered a foot injury and was replaced by Salman Irshad for 2-3 matches. Meanwhile, Mohammad Mohsin from Peshawar Zalmi also got injured and was unavailable for at least a week and was replaced by Yasir Shah.

Kieron Pollard who was expected to join the Peshawar Zalmi squad after the conclusion of West Indies tour of Sri Lanka, suffered a niggle in his right thigh and was replaced by Carlos Brathwaite for the whole season, who was earlier named as his temporary replacement. On 8 March in the match against Lahore Qalandars, Aamer Yamin suffered a hamstring injury while bowling and was replaced by Waqas Maqsood in the Kings squad for the remaining season.

Ahead of the play-offs, teams included new players in their squad as Faf du Plessis, Khurram Shehzad and Hardus Viljoen replaced Kieron Pollard, Mohammad Amir Khan and Liam Dawson in Peshawar Zalmi squad. In Multan Sultans squad Mahmudullah and Adam Lyth replaced Moeen Ali and Fabian Allen respectively. Lahore Qalandars replaced Chris Lynn, Salman Butt and Seekkuge Prasanna with Tamim Iqbal, Abid Ali and Agha Salman respectively. While, Karachi Kings replaced Chris Jordan and Ali Khan with Sherfane Rutherford and Waqas Maqsood.

References

External link
 

Pakistan Super League player drafts
2020 Pakistan Super League
December 2019 sports events in Pakistan